Georgie Francomb (born 8 September 1991) is an English professional footballer who plays for Dorking Wanderers. He can also play at right-back.

Career

Early years
Francomb joined the academy of Premier League side Tottenham Hotspur at the age of 9 and remained with the club until he was released at the age of 14. At the age of 16, he joined the academy of Championship side Norwich City. On 6 October 2009, the 18-year–old made his first team debut for the Canaries in a 1–0 victory over Gillingham in the Second Round of the 2009-10 Football League Trophy. Francomb made his Football League debut on 10 October 2009 in a 1–0 away win over Carlisle United. He then went on to make a third start for the club in his home debut against Swindon Town on 24 October 2009. George was offered his first professional contract with "The Canaries" at the end of March 2010 and signed it on 1 July 2010. On 7 October 2010, Francomb joined Barnet on loan

In January 2012, Francomb was loaned to Scottish Premier League club Hibernian. He made his debut for Hibs on 14 January, in a 3–2 win against Dunfermline. Francomb set up the opening goal in a 2–0 victory for Hibs against Ayr United in the Scottish Cup. He became recognised for his impressive range of passing and crossing abilities, and his dangerous set-pieces. Francomb left Hibs after their 2012 Scottish Cup Final defeat, in which he appeared as a substitute. Soon after returning to Norwich, Francomb agreed a new contract with the club. After a stint on loan at AFC Wimbledon from late August to late November, Francomb was released following the 2012–13 season.

AFC Wimbledon
Francomb joined AFC Wimbledon on a one-month loan deal on transfer deadline day August 2012; the deal was extended for another month on 5 October after he made 7 appearances in a month. Although a right back primarily, Francomb proved his capabilities as a winger. On 24 November 2012, it was announced that he would return to his parent club, having made 16 appearances in all competitions for "The Dons". Following his release from Norwich at the end of the 2012–13 season, Francomb rejoined AFC Wimbledon on 26 June 2013. Francomb scored his first career goal in a Football League Trophy first-round game that saw Brentford beat AFC Wimbledon 5–3 at Griffin Park on 3 September 2013.

He was released by AFC Wimbledon at the end of the 2017–18 season.

Crawley Town
On 5 June 2018, following his release from Wimbledon, Francomb agreed to join League Two side Crawley Town on a two-year deal. He became club captain at Crawley Town for the 2020–21 season. He scored his first goal for Crawley on 26 September 2020; a goal from 25 yards in a 3–2 away victory against Oldham Athletic. He scored 6 goals in 35 appearances across the 2020–21 season.

Dorking Wanderers
On 3 February 2023, following his release from Crawley Town, Francomb joined National League side Dorking Wanderers.

Career statistics

References

External links

1991 births
Living people
Footballers from Hackney, London
English footballers
Association football defenders
Norwich City F.C. players
Barnet F.C. players
Hibernian F.C. players
AFC Wimbledon players
Crawley Town F.C. players
Dorking Wanderers F.C. players
English Football League players
Scottish Premier League players